Nicolás Enrique Della Torre (born 1 March 1990) is an Argentine field hockey player who plays as a midfielder or forward for Belgian Hockey League club Dragons and the Argentina national team.

Club career
Della Torre played in Argentina for Ciudad de Buenos Aires. When he became the top scorer of the Argentinian league in 2017, he transferred to the Netherlands to play for Den Bosch. Due to problems with getting an Italian passport to be eligible to play in the Netherlands, he could not play for Den Bosch in the first half of the 2017–18 season. He played in Malaysia Hockey League for Terengganu during the 2017 Dutch winter break. In April 2019, he agreed to play for Leuven from the 2019–20 season onwards. In his final season for Den Bosch he scored 13 goals which made him the seventh highest top scorer of the season. After one season he left Leuven for Dragons. In his first season he won the Belgian league title.

International career
Della Torre won his first medal with the national team at the 2013 South American Championship. In June 2015 he was selected for the 2015 Pan American Games, where they won the gold medal. He made his World Cup debut at the 2023 Men's FIH Hockey World Cup.

Honours

International
Argentina
Pan American Games gold medal: 2015
Pan American Cup: 2022
South American Championship: 2013

Club
Terengganu
TNB Cup: 2017
Dragons
Belgian Hockey League: 2020–21

References

External links

1990 births
Living people
Field hockey players from Buenos Aires
Argentine male field hockey players
Male field hockey midfielders
Male field hockey forwards
Field hockey players at the 2015 Pan American Games
Pan American Games medalists in field hockey
Pan American Games gold medalists for Argentina
HC Den Bosch players
Men's Hoofdklasse Hockey players
Expatriate field hockey players
Argentine expatriate sportspeople in the Netherlands
Argentine expatriate sportspeople in Malaysia
Argentine expatriate sportspeople in Belgium
Men's Belgian Hockey League players
KHC Leuven players
KHC Dragons players
Medalists at the 2015 Pan American Games
2023 Men's FIH Hockey World Cup players